Arpitania (Arpitan and Italian: Arpitania, French: Arpitanie) is a controversial term which denotes the purported ethnic or cultural unity of the Western Alps, represented by speakers of Franco-Provençal (termed Arpitan).

"Arpitania" roughly corresponds to the historical County of Savoy and its successor state the Duchy of Savoy:
 France (Ain, Rhône, Savoie, Haute-Savoie, a big part of the Isère department, southern Franche-Comté). The northwestern salient (roughly a strip between Mâcon and Roanne) is seen linguistically transitional between Arpitan, Occitan, and other Oïl languages.
 Italy (Aosta Valley, parts of Piedmont, Faeto and Celle di San Vito in the Province of Foggia, in Apulia)
 Switzerland (Romandy, excluding the northern and western parts of Jura)

The terms Arpitan and Arpitania (Arpitanie) are neologisms coined in the 1970s by Joseph Henriet (born 1945), a Communist school teacher who was influenced by the Basque activist Federico Krutwig. In his Garaldea (published 1978), Krutwig names the Basques "Garalditans", a purported Neolithic race which he claimed existed thousands of years ago. Looking for racial or linguistic remnants of the "Garalditans", he moved to the Aosta Valley in 1970, constructing Basque etymologies for local placenames.

In Aosta, Krutwig befriended the young Maoist activist Joseph Henriet. Influenced by Krutwig, Henriet declared the local patois the descendant of the Neolithic "Garalditan language". He later replaced the term garalditan with harpitan, a conflation of the patois words arpa "alp", arpian "one who works on an alp", and the Basque etymology Basque harri-pe "under the rocks" proposed by Krutwig.

Around 1980, Harriet dropped the Basque-inspired initial h-, now proposing an "Arpitan confederation" (Confédération arpitane) uniting Savoy and the Valais (but not including the patois-speaking Vaud). With the failure of his Arpitan political movement, he retired to private life.

The term arpitan since the 1990s has found usage beyond the immediate sphere of Henriet's activities, especially driven by online use. Pichard (2009) suggests its newfound success was due to the happy rhyme with Occitan and the unwieldiness of the alternative  francoprovençal. The alternative term patois, while viewed with affection in Switzerland, has a condescending or "humiliating" connotation in France. An  Aliance Culturèla Arpitana was founded in 2004.

See also 
 Occitania
 Padania

References

Bibliography 
 Jozé Harrieta [Joseph Henriet], La lingua arpitana, 1976.
 Mikael Bodlore-Penlaez, «Savoy and Aosta, heart of the Arpitan people» in Atlas of Stateless Nations in Europe: Minority People in Search of Recognition, Y Lolfa, 2011. 
Les Alpes et leurs noms de lieux, 6000 ans d'histoire ? : Les appellations d'origine pré-indo-européenne., Paul-Louis Rousset, 1988, 
Les mots de la montagne autour du Mont-Blanc, Hubert Bessat et Claudette Germi, Ed. Ellug, Programme Rhône-Alpes, Recherches en Sciences Humaines, 1991, .

External links 
 Aliance Culturèla Arpitana
 Babel Lexilogos (French)
 Harpitanya Movement Flag
 Listen to some audio documents in an Arpitan dialect.

Regions of France
Geographical, historical and cultural regions of France
 
Geography of Switzerland
Geography of France
Geography of Italy